Ambenja is a coastal town in the Boeny Region of northwestern Madagascar. It is located near the Mozambique Channel and is approximately 70 kilometers north of Mahajanga.

References

Populated places in Boeny